A  prefectural museum is a museum that specializes in collections local to a prefecture of Japan.

Prefectural museums emerged in postwar Japan, and since these institutions are of recent origin their collections tend not to contain older Japan arts, with primarily Meiji era, 20th-century, and contemporary art. Most prefectural museums feature collections of arts, culture, and history with a strong emphasis on their native prefecture, but can exhibit works and collections from outside of the prefecture alongside the native collections, usually contemporary art from cultural centers such as Tokyo and exotic art from outside Japan. For example, the Nagasaki Prefectural Art Museum specializing in art related to the city of Nagasaki also houses a collection of paintings from Spain belonging to a Japanese collector. 

Prefectural museums tend to be large and some are more distinguished for their own architecture than for the collections they hold. Noted architect Kunio Maekawa designed both the Kumamoto Prefectural Art Museum in Kumamoto as well as the Saitama Prefectural Museum at Ōmiya Ward, Saitama.

List of prefectural museums
Examples of prefectural museums include:

 Aichi Prefectural Ceramic Museum
 Aomori Prefectural Museum
 Fukui Prefectural Dinosaur Museum
 Fukui Prefectural Museum of Cultural History
 Fukuoka Prefectural Museum of Art
 Fukushima Prefectural Museum of Art
 Hiroshima Prefectural Art Museum
 Hiroshima Prefectural Museum of History
 Hyōgo Prefectural Museum of Art
 Ibaraki Prefectural Museum of History
 Ishikawa Prefectural History Museum
 Ishikawa Prefectural Museum of Art
 Ishikawa Prefectural Museum of Traditional Arts and Crafts
 Kōchi Prefectural Museum of Art
 Kōchi Prefectural Museum of History
 Kumamoto Prefectural Ancient Burial Mound Museum
 Kumamoto Prefectural Museum of Art
 Miyazaki Prefectural Art Museum
 Miyazaki Prefectural Museum of Nature and History
 Ōita Prefectural Museum of History
 Okayama Prefectural Museum
 Okayama Prefectural Museum of Art
 Okinawa Prefectural Museum
 Osaka Prefectural Chikatsu Asuka Museum
 Reimeikan, Kagoshima Prefectural Center for Historical Material
 Saga Prefectural Museum
 Saga Prefectural Nagoya Castle Museum
 Saitama Prefectural Museum of the Sakitama Ancient Burial Mounds
 Tochigi Prefectural Museum
 Tochigi Prefectural Museum of Fine Arts
 Tokushima Prefectural Museum
 Tottori Prefectural Museum
 Wakayama Prefectural Museum
 Yamagata Prefectural Museum
 Yamaguchi Prefectural Museum
 Yamaguchi Prefectural Museum of Art

References

See also
 Japanese museums
 List of museums in Japan

Prefectural museums
Types of museums